Maria Morais Werneck de Castro (Rio de Janeiro, 1909 - Rio de Janeiro, 1993) was a Brazilian lawyer, militant communist, and feminist.

Life
Castro was born on October 8, 1909 in barrio Laranjeiras , the daughter of attorney Justo de Moraes and Herminia Cresta Mendes de Moraes. In school, she studied law. She married the communist militant Luis Werneck de Castro, also a lawyer.

Castro was a communist activist who fought for women's suffrage rights, since 1930. She participated in the Federación Brasileña por el Progreso Femenino, and in the Liga Antifascista. Castro was a close friend of Luís Carlos Prestes and his sister, Clotilde Prestes, as well as a companion to Nise da Silveira and Olga Benário Prestes, the latter having been accused of being one of the leaders of the Communist Revolt of 1935. Castro went into exile in Argentina. She became a member of the Brazilian Communist Party in 1947, serving in the Movimiento Unitario de los Trabajadores e Intelectuales. Towards the end of her life, Castro became devoted to education, being a professor of Portuguese and history.

Castro died on April 6, 1994 in Rio de Janeiro.

Selected works
Aquarelas : espécies vegetais em extinção (1987) 
Sala 4 : primeira prisão política feminina (1988) 
No tempo dos barões : histórias do apogeu e decadência de uma família fluminense no ciclo do café (with Moacir Werneck de Castro; 2004) 
Natureza viva : memórias, carreira e obra de uma pioneira do desenho científico no Brasil (with Moacir Werneck de Castro; 2004)

See also 
 List of suffragists and suffragettes

References

Bibliography

1909 births
1993 deaths
Brazilian communists
Brazilian feminist writers
Brazilian suffragists
Brazilian non-fiction writers
20th-century Brazilian women writers
Brazilian women lawyers
20th-century Brazilian writers
20th-century Brazilian lawyers
20th-century women lawyers
20th-century non-fiction writers